Frances Payne Bolton (née Bingham; March 29, 1885 – March 9, 1977) was a Republican politician from Ohio. She served in the United States House of Representatives. She was the first woman elected to Congress from Ohio. In the late 1930s Bolton took an isolationist position on foreign policy, opposing the Selective Service Act (the draft) in 1940, and opposing Lend-Lease in 1941.  During the war she called for desegregation of the military nursing units, which were all-white and all-female.  In 1947 she sponsored a long-range bill for nursing education, but it did not pass.  When the draft was resumed after the war, Bolton strongly advocated the conscription of women.  Pointing to their prominent role during the war, she said it was vitally important that women continue to play these essential roles.  She saw no threat to marriage, and argued that women in military service would develop their character and skills, thus enhancing their role in the family.  As a member of the House Foreign Affairs Committee, Bolton strongly supported the United Nations, especially UNICEF, and strongly supported the independence of African colonies.

Early life
She was born on March 29, 1885, in Cleveland, Ohio, as Frances Payne Bingham. She was the daughter of Charles William Bingham (1846–1929) and Mary Perry (née Payne) Bingham (1854–1898).  Her siblings included Oliver Perry Bingham, William H. Bingham, Elizabeth Beardsley (née Bingham) Blossom, and Henry Payne Bingham.

Among her maternal family members was uncle Nathan P. Payne (the former mayor of Cleveland), Oliver Hazard Payne (who worked for Standard Oil), and aunt Flora Payne (the wife of U.S. Secretary of the Navy William Collins Whitney).  Her maternal grandfather was wealthy U.S. Senator, Henry B. Payne.

Frances was educated at private schools in Cleveland, New York City, and in Paris.

Career
Active in public health, nursing education and other social service, education, and philanthropic work, she succeeded her husband, Chester C. Bolton, in office a few months after his death in 1939.  Upon election to the remainder of her late husband's term, Bolton refused the customary widow's allowance comprising the remainder of the salary her late husband would have collected had he served out his term.  She represented the 22nd District, mostly consisting of Cleveland's eastern suburbs. Bolton served an additional fourteen terms, serving alongside her son, Oliver P. Bolton, for three of those terms. She and Oliver appeared on What's My Line? as the only mother and son serving together. It was reported that when he voted against her, she once stage-whispered, "That's my adopted son."

A confidential 1943 analysis of the House Foreign Affairs Committee by Isaiah Berlin for the British Foreign Office described Bolton as

Serving on the House Foreign Affairs Committee, Bolton called Secretary of State John Foster Dulles in May 1954 after the fall of the French base at Dien Bien Phu, urging him to invite nurse Genevieve de Galard to the United States. When Galard arrived in July, Bolton described her as a "symbol of heroic femininity in the free world". After receiving the Presidential Medal of Freedom, Galard was received at a dinner for three hundred in Congresswoman Bolton's home district of Cleveland while on a tour of the country.

Bolton voted in favor of the Civil Rights Acts of 1957, 1960, 1964, and 1968, and the Voting Rights Act of 1965.

House Foreign Affairs Committee
In 1955, she became the first American woman member of Congress to head an international delegation, using her own resources to fund it. As a member of the House Foreign Affairs Committee's subcommittee on Africa, she felt it was her responsibility to visit as much of Africa as possible. Arriving in Senegal on September 1, she spent the next six weeks crisscrossing the continent by plane, train, boat, and car. Her important stops included Liberia, Ghana (then still known as the Gold Coast), the Belgian Congo, Northern Rhodesia (now Zambia), Southern Rhodesia (now Zimbabwe), South Africa, and Ethiopia. She met with leading nationalists such as Kwame Nkrumah, powerful politicians such as Haile Selassie, and leading women such as the Queen Mother of the Tutsis. She also spent a lot of time during her trip visiting schools and talking with young people, and meeting with women from all walks of life in the markets or clinics. As someone with a lifelong interest in education and health care, she prioritized these issues during her African travels.

When she got back to the United States she submitted a very thorough and insightful report to Congress. One of her recommendations was that Congress should create a new State Department Bureau for African Affairs to be overseen by a new assistant secretary of state for African affairs. Bolton helped to see that this did in fact happen, and Congress created the new bureau in 1958. In addition to sharing information about her trip with Congress through her official report, Bolton also made an impressive effort to enlighten the American people about the diversity of the African continent by creating a film about her trip, entitled Africa: Giant With a Future, 1955. This film is an excellent resource for students and instructors wanting a look at several African countries/colonies in the mid-1950s and has been made available on DVD by the National Archives. In addition to educating Congress and the general public about Africa, Bolton's trip helped to begin the process of opening doors for women to play a major role in US foreign relations.

In addition to influencing US relations with Africa, another of Bolton's most lasting achievements was sponsoring legislation to purchase property across the Potomac River from Mount Vernon, the home of George Washington.  This prevented commercialization of the area and preserved its appearance as it was when Washington lived there.  Bolton had a phenomenal relationship with her constituents of Italian-American heritage and was known for mailing government child-care pamphlets to homes where new children were born. The nursing school at Case Western Reserve University is named in her honor for her accomplishments and generosity in the field of public nursing.

Later life
After rising to become ranking minority member of the House Foreign Affairs Committee, Bolton was defeated in a bid for a sixteenth term in 1968 by Charles Vanik.  She was, until Louise Slaughter's continued service in 2012, the oldest woman to serve in the House of Representatives.  Bolton retired to her family home, Franchester (named for herself and her late husband), in Lyndhurst, Ohio.

Personal life
In 1907, Frances was married to Chester Castle Bolton (1882–1939). Together, they were the parents of four children:

 Charles Bingham Bolton (1909–1976), a dentist who developed the "Bolton Standards of Craniofacial Growth".
 Kenyon Castle Bolton (1912–1983), a philanthropist and patron of the arts who married Mary Idelle Peters of Lancaster, Ohio.
 Oliver Payne Bolton (1917–1972), who also served in the U.S. House of Representatives.
 Elizabeth Bolton (1919–1919), who died in infancy.

She died in Lyndhurst, Ohio, on March 9, 1977, and was interred at Lake View Cemetery in Cleveland.

Legacy
She was a devotee of yoga.  The Bolton Fellowship supports research in parapsychology.

Bolton and her husband donated land adjacent to their estate in 1922 to create the campus of Hawken School in Lyndhurst, Ohio. Her sons attended the private country day school.

Her papers are held at the Western Reserve Historical Society.

The school of nursing at Case Western Reserve University in Cleveland is named Frances Payne Bolton School of Nursing in her honor.

See also
 Women in the United States House of Representatives

Sources

References
 David Loth. A Long Way Forward, A Biography of a Congresswoman: Frances P. Bolton (New York: Longmans, Green 1957).

External links

 Biographical Directory of the United States Congress
 
 [Gateway to Paradise: Bingham-Bolton-Blossom Estate in Palm Beach] – Casa Apava, built in 1918 for Frances Payne Bolton. 

Spring, Kelly. "Frances Bolton". National Women's History Museum. 2017.

1885 births
1977 deaths
Burials at Lake View Cemetery, Cleveland
Female members of the United States House of Representatives
People from Lyndhurst, Ohio
People from Palm Beach, Florida
Politicians from Cleveland
Spouses of Ohio politicians
Women in Ohio politics
20th-century American politicians
20th-century American women politicians
Republican Party members of the United States House of Representatives from Ohio